14 Going on 30 is a 1988 American made-for-television comedy film that was broadcast by American Broadcasting Company and Buena Vista Television and later distributed by Walt Disney Home Video. Directed by Paul Schneider, it stars Steven Eckholdt as Danny, a 14-year-old boy who is infatuated with his teacher Miss Peggy Noble (Daphne Ashbrook). Danny uses a "growth accelerator" to make himself appear older than his actual age in an attempt to seduce her. A similar age swap and a nearly identical title appear in the 2004 film 13 Going on 30, and the earlier film may have influenced the later one.

Plot
The 14-year-old Danny O'Neil (Gabey Olds) is madly in love with his teacher, Miss Peggy Noble (Daphne Ashbrook). Since she is engaged to the cold-tempered and vicious gym teacher, Roy Kelton (Rick Rossovich), who is nicknamed "Jackjaw" for his constant threat of breaking his pupils' jaws, Danny goes through his school days somewhat uninspired and suffers in silence.

One day, he oversees his geeky friend, Lloyd Duffy (Adam Carl), an orphan who happens to live next door with his uncaring uncle, Herb (Harry Morgan), and ditsy aunt, May (Irene Tedrow), and grows fruits with an experimental "growth accelerator." Danny becomes obsessed with the idea of turning himself into a grown man with the machine to break up Miss Noble's engagement and to as convincing her to give him a chance. Lloyd is reluctant to help since he is aware of everything that could go wrong. That makes Danny secretly break into the lab and use the machine that very night since he sees the timing as perfect, as his parents will be leaving the house for a week. Not caring about the potential consequences, he turns himself into a 30-year-old man (Steve Eckholdt).

The next day, Lloyd immediately starts working on a machine with the opposite effect to return Danny to his 14-year-old self. Meanwhile, Danny visits the high school to pursue Miss Noble. When he arrives, he is promptly mistaken for the school's new principal, Harold Forndexter, who should have arrived to take up his position that morning (the real Forndexter has been delayed, but   a miscommunication prevented the school from being informed). Playing along with the misconception, Danny impresses his assistant, Louisa Horton (Loretta Swit), with the introduction of his new rules, which include having as much fun as possible, but also Peggy, who admires his youthful approach to life.

Lloyd, however, is having no luck with his attempts to turn Danny back to his younger age, as all of his prototype machines killed the tomatoes that he used as test subjects. Lloyd is also becoming slightly jealous of Danny, who now seems to have total freedom, unlike Lloyd, who is stuck with an adoptive family that never wanted him. Lloyd begins openly wondering what it would be like to become a man. Unconcerned with all of that, Danny continues to pursue a relationship with Peggy. Much to the dismay of Kelton, she agrees to go on a date with Danny even though Kelton follows every step. Peggy has a splendid evening with the new principal, and they almost kiss at the end of the night.

During a school dance, Danny finally convinces Peggy that Kelton is not right for her, and she breaks off the engagement. By then, Lloyd has finally completed a working machine. However, when he goes to inform Danny, Lloyd discovers that Danny's "Harold" persona has completely taken him over, and he refuses to change back. He tells Lloyd that he likes his new body and life and that he will never become Danny again. Immediately afterward, Danny and Peggy become a couple. Kelton refuses to accept that, tries to find out more on Forndexter, and discovers that "Harold" is an impostor. Kelton immediately informs the police, who arrive quickly to arrest Danny, which gives him no choice but to transform back into a kid. Lloyd meets "Harold" and lets him know that the machine is ready to change him back. Before leaving with Lloyd, "Harold" meets Peggy just before the police arrive to tell her that he has to leave town for good, but he does not reveal to her the truth about his real identity. Kelton, arriving with the police, barely manages to miss "Harold." Kelton gleefully informs Peggy of "Harold" being a fraud. Peggy, realizing Kelton's true nature as a selfish jerk, hits "Jackjaw" in his own jaw and officially ends their relationship for good.

With Lloyd's help, "Harold" manages to evade the police with just their bikes, and they make it back to Lloyd's lab, where "Harold" is changed back into Danny just as his parents arrive back to the house. However, Peggy followed him and witnessed his transformation and so she now realizes the truth about "Harold" and Danny. Because she has fallen in love with him, she convinces Lloyd to use the machine to turn herself into a 14-year-old (Amy Hathaway), which enables herto be with Danny. Meanwhile, to escape his abusive family, Lloyd finally gives in to temptation and uses the machine to turn himself into a professor, called Mr. Lloyd (Sal Viscuso), and starts working at the same high school. He is introduced to Danny's class (now including the teenaged Peggy) as Peggy's replacement by the real Harold Forndexter (Alan Thicke), who also announces that some of the changes that were made by the man masquerading as him are not bad and may actually remain in place at the school.

Cast
Gabey Olds as Danny O'Neil at 14
Steve Eckholdt as Danny O'Neil at 30 ("Happy" Harold Forndexter)
Adam Carl as Lloyd Duffy at 14
Sal Viscuso as Lloyd Duffy "Mr. Lloyd" at 30
Irene Tedrow as May
Patrick Duffy as an actor in a classic film
Harry Morgan as Herb
Loretta Swit as Miss Louisa Horton
Alan Thicke as the real Harold Forndexter
Dick Van Patten as Mr. Loomis
Rick Rossovich as Roy "Jackjaw" Kelton
Amy Hathaway as Peggy Noble at 14
Daphne Ashbrook as Miss Peggy Noble at 30

References

External links 
 

1988 films
1988 television films
American science fiction comedy films
Films scored by Lee Holdridge
Films about rapid human age change
1980s science fiction comedy films
1980s English-language films
Films directed by Paul Schneider (director)
1980s American films